Spaulding is a village in Sangamon County, Illinois, United States. The population was 873 at the 2010 census. It is part of the Springfield, Illinois Metropolitan Statistical Area. Spaulding is in the Riverton School District #14.

Geography
Spaulding is located at  (39.865393, -89.541742).

Demographics

As of the census of 2000, there were 559 people, 189 households, and 154 families residing in the village. The racial makeup of the village was 98.57% White, 0.72% Native American, 0.18% from other races, and 0.54% from two or more races. Hispanic or Latino of any race were 0.89% of the population.

There were 189 households, out of which 41.3% had children under the age of 18 living with them, 69.8% were married couples living together, 8.5% had a female householder with no husband present, and 18.5% were non-families. 13.8% of all households were made up of individuals, and 3.2% had someone living alone who was 65 years of age or older. The average household size was 2.96 and the average family size was 3.26.

In the village, the population was spread out, with 30.2% under the age of 18, 7.0% from 18 to 24, 29.5% from 25 to 44, 27.5% from 45 to 64, and 5.7% who were 65 years of age or older. The median age was 36 years. For every 100 females, there were 101.1 males. For every 100 females age 18 and over, there were 92.1 males.

The median income for a household in the village was $67,083, and the median income for a family was $70,455. Males had a median income of $44,375 versus $30,625 for females. The per capita income for the village was $21,168. About 3.3% of families and 5.1% of the population were below the poverty line, including 8.9% of those under age 18 and none of those age 65 or over.

Notable people
Justin Allgaier – NASCAR driver

References

Villages in Sangamon County, Illinois
Villages in Illinois
Springfield metropolitan area, Illinois